Madala Narayana Swamy was an Indian politician. He was a Member of Parliament, representing Ongole in the Lok Sabha, the lower house of India's Parliament, as a member of the Communist Party of India.

References

External links
Official biographical sketch in Parliament of India website

Lok Sabha members from Andhra Pradesh
Communist Party of India politicians from Andhra Pradesh
India MPs 1962–1967
Possibly living people
Year of birth missing